The Italy men's national under-18 ice hockey team is the men's national under-18 ice hockey team of Italy. The team is controlled by the Federazione Italiana Sport del Ghiaccio, a member of the International Ice Hockey Federation. The team represents Italy at the IIHF World U18 Championships.

International competitions

IIHF World U18 Championships

1999: 5th in Pool B
2000: 6th in Pool B
2001: 6th in Division I
2002: 5th in Division I
2003: 3rd in Division I Group B
2004: 3rd in Division I Group B
2005: 6th in Division I Group B

2006: 1st in Division II Group A
2007: 4th in Division I Group A
2008: 4th in Division I Group B
2009: 6th in Division I Group B
2010: 1st in Division II Group A
2011: 2nd in Division I Group A
2012: 3rd in Division I Group A

External links
Italy at IIHF.com

National under-18 ice hockey teams
under